Briana Barbara-Jane Evigan is an American actress and dancer best known for her roles in the Step Up series and for her scream queen roles in numerous horror films. Born in Los Angeles, Evigan is the daughter of actor Greg Evigan and his wife Pamela, a dancer, model and choreographer. She began dancing and acting at a young age, graduating from Los Angeles Valley College with a degree in speech and communication.

Evigan began dancing professionally and appeared in numerous music videos, most notably "Numb" by Linkin Park (2003). She also started acting and had small roles in films such as Bottom's Up (2006) and television series such as Fear Itself (2008). She made her breakthrough when she appeared as Andrea "Andie" West in the dance film Step Up 2: The Streets (2008). She has since been noted as a Scream Queen for starring in numerous horror and thriller films, including S. Darko (2009), Sorority Row (2009),  Burning Bright (2010), Mother's Day (2010), The Devil's Carnival (2012), Stash House (2012), Mine Games (2012), Alleluia! The Devil's Carnival (2016) and the second season of From Dusk Till Dawn (2015).

Early and personal life 
Evigan was born in Los Angeles, California, the daughter of Pamela C. Serpe, a dancer, model and actress, and actor Greg Evigan. She has Polish (from her paternal grandmother) and Italian (from her maternal grandfather) heritage. She is the youngest of three siblings, with brother Jason and sister Vanessa. She has studied dance since she was nine. She is one of the singers and plays keyboards in the group Moorish Idol. She also undertook a speech and communication degree at Los Angeles Valley College. She currently lives in Los Angeles, California, where she usually has Fanchats with fans through UStream, and has her own YouTube channel, in which she posted exercise videos; the channel is currently inactive.

Career 
A professional dancer, Evigan has appeared in music videos for Linkin Park, Flo Rida, T-Pain and Enrique Iglesias. She has also had small roles in television series and films such as Bottom's Up, Something Sweet and Fear Itself.

In 2008, she won the breakout role of Andie West in the sequel to the 2006 dance drama Step Up, Step Up 2: The Streets. Filming took place in late 2007 in Baltimore and was released February 14, 2008. The film, which met with negative reviews with Rotten Tomatoes (receiving 24%), achieved box office success earning a worldwide gross of $148,424,320. Both Evigan and co-star Robert Hoffman earned the Best Kiss Award at the 2008 MTV Movie Awards.

In 2009, S. Darko, a sequel to the 2001 cult-hit horror Donnie Darko, was released. Evigan played Samantha Darko's best friend, Corey. The film stars James Lafferty and Ed Westwick. A theatrical release was scrapped and was released Straight-to-DVD on May 12, 2009. Unlike Donnie Darko, the film received negative reviews.

In August 2008, Summit Entertainment announced Evigan has signed on to portray the central character Cassidy Tappan in the remake of the low-budget horror film Sorority Row. The screenplay was written by Good Luck Chuck writer Josh Stolberg and directed by Stewart Hendler. The film was budgeted at $12,500,000. Evigan stars alongside Audrina Patridge, Rumer Willis and Jamie Chung. Sorority Row was released on September 11, 2009, and debuted at No. 6 at the box office and earned worldwide $26,735,797. Critical reception was mixed to negative. Evigan's performance was well received by critics. The leading female cast members earned a ShoWest Award for "Female Stars of Tomorrow" in April 2009. The DVD release was February 23, 2010.

In January 2009, Evigan was confirmed by Lionsgate to star in Burning Bright. She plays the lead female role, Kelly Taylor. In the film, "A young woman and her autistic brother find themselves trapped in their house with a ravenous tiger during a hurricane". Critical reception was extremely positive. Despite this, the film was announced to be released Straight-to-DVD on August 17, 2010.

In February 2009, Evigan announced in an interview she has signed on for another remake. The film will be a remake of the cult slasher horror film Mother's Day and will be directed by Darren Lynn Bousman, best known for his work with previous Lionsgate films such as the Saw trilogy. Bousman previously directed Evigan in an episode of Fear Itself in 2008. The film will co-star A. J. Cook and Jaime King. The film has suffered numerous push backs, and was finally released on May 8, 2012, on DVD and Blu-ray. The film was also part of the 2010 Cannes Film Festival.

Evigan played the central character in the indie drama romance film Subject: I Love You.

She stars in The Devil's Carnival, a short film that got a 30 city world tour that began on April 15, 2012. Evigan later confirmed that she had reprised her role in its sequel, The Devil's Carnival: Alleluia!, which was released in late 2015.

In 2011, during a UStream, Evigan announced that she was working in a TV series with her family, though nothing has been confirmed yet. She was scheduled to star as the protagonist of Left for Red: Betrayal, the first of a trilogy which centered on a young woman seeking vengeance on the soldiers who sold her to a sex trafficking group, but has been shelved due to budget issues.

In 2014, Evigan reprised her role as Andie West in the fifth installment of the Step Up series, Step Up: All In. She was later cast Love Is All You Need? as Jude, a heterosexual woman living in a world where homosexuality is right, and heterosexuality is the wrong.

In 2015, Evigan announced, via Twitter that she would be recurring, alongside Danny Trejo in the second season of the Action-Vampire TV Series From Dusk Till Dawn: The Series as Sonja, "an American expatriate working as a tattoo artist in a Mexican Mercado – who also has a sideline forging papers and passports out of her back room". The season premiered August 25, 2015, on El Rey.

In 2017, she joined director James Kicklighter's Angel of Anywhere, with co-stars David A. Gregory, Ser'Darius Blain and introducing Axel Roldos.

Filmography

Film

Television

Music videos

Awards and nominations

References

External links 

 

Living people
20th-century American actresses
21st-century American actresses
21st-century American singers
21st-century American women singers
Actresses from Los Angeles
American child actresses
American female dancers
American film actresses
American people of Italian descent
American people of Polish descent
Los Angeles Valley College people
Year of birth missing (living people)